Hacıhamzalar is a village in the District of Koçarlı, Aydın Province, Turkey. As of 2010 it had a population of 174 people.

References

Villages in Koçarlı District